Kent Johnson (1955 – October 25, 2022) was an American poet, translator, critic, and anthologist. His work, much of it meta-fictional and/or satirical in approach, has provoked a notable measure of controversy and debate within English-language poetry circles.

Life and career 

From the late 1990s, Johnson was widely been thought to be the author of the Araki Yasusada writings, which a reviewer for the Nation magazine, in 1998, called “the most controversial work of poetry since Allen Ginsberg’s Howl.”  Johnson, however, never officially claimed authorship of the material, presenting himself only as “executor” of an archive supposedly composed by a writer, or writers, whose choice was to maintain a principled anonymity in relation to the work. In recent years, the Yasusada discussion has moved from the realm of literary scandal and gossip into considerations of more scholarly kind, and a substantial number of academic articles have engaged the topic, pro and con. In 2011, a book of critical studies, Scubadivers and Chrysanthemums: Essays on the Poetry of Araki Yasusada, was published in England, to which Johnson was one of eighteen contributors.

Lyric Poetry after Auschwitz: Eleven Submissions to the War (its contents later included into a larger collection, Homage to the Last Avant-Garde, 2009) was published in 2005. As the first book of poetry in the United States to respond to the wars in Afghanistan and Iraq, it was the subject of numerous reviews and blog commentaries, a good deal of the latter hostile. The title poem of the collection, “Lyric Poetry after Auschwitz, or: Get the Hood Back On,” angrily confronts the torture committed at Abu Ghraib and elsewhere, though it does so in a manner quite non-conventional for “anti-war” poetry: The poem proceeds in a series of stanzas set in the voices of American military prison guards, who calmly chat with Iraqi prisoners and sociably describe their quite normal backgrounds at home, before graphically informing the prisoners of the tortures to which they will be subjected. The poem, however, concludes unexpectedly when the voice of a generic U. S. poet joins the chorus of torturers, and in good-natured tone tells his captive to stop pleading and just accept the horror of his fate, because there is, after all, nothing that poetry can do to help him.

Latterly, Johnson became the focus of controversy, including threatened legal action, when he published a book that proposed, by means of an elaborate, forensically detailed hypothesis (supplemented in the book by a quasi-detective novella), that the poet Kenneth Koch may have been the hidden author of “A True Account of Talking to the Sun at Fire Island,” one of Frank O’Hara’s canonical poems, composing it shortly after O’Hara’s death, and then placing it under his late friend’s name in a sui generis act of comradeship and mourning. First published in a limited edition in 2011, an expanded, second edition of this book, titled A Question Mark above the Sun: Documents on the Mystery Surrounding a Famous Poem "by" Frank O’Hara, was published in 2012 and named a “Book of the Year” by the Times Literary Supplement.

Johnson lived most of his childhood and adolescence in Montevideo, Uruguay, returning to work there in the mid-1970s. In the early 1980s, on two extended visits, he worked with the Sandinista Revolution as a literacy and Adult Education teaching volunteer in rural zones of Nicaragua. Since 1991, he has taught English and Spanish at Highland Community College in Freeport, Illinois. In 2004, he was named State Teacher of the Year by the Illinois Community College Board of Trustees. He has received a Pushcart Book of the Month Award, an Ohio Board of Regents Grant for research in the U.S.S.R., an Illinois Arts Council Poetry Prize, a National Endowment for the Arts Literature Fellowship, a PEN Translation Grant, a Finalist nomination for the PEN Award for Poetry in Translation, a travel grant from the University of Chile, and a Visiting Writer Grant from the U.S. Embassy in Uruguay.

Johnson died on October 25, 2022, at the age of 67. He was survived by his wife, Deb, and his two sons.

Selected works

Poetry and Chapbooks
Waves of Drifting Snow. Ox Head Press, 1986. 
Dear Lacan: An Analysis in Correspondence. (with Jaques Debrot), CCCP Translation Series (UK), 2003.
The Miseries of Poetry: Traductions from the Greek. CCCP Translation Series (UK), 2003.
The Miseries of Poetry: Traductions from the Greek. Skanky Possum Press, 2004. 
Epigramititis: 118 Living American Poets. BlazeVOX Books, 2005.
Lyric Poetry After Auschwitz: Eleven Submissions to the War. Effing Press, 2005.
I Once Met. Longhouse Books, 2007.
Homage to the Last Avant-Garde. Shearsman Books (UK), 2008. 
5 Works from the Rejection Group. Habenicht Press, 2012.
 [Untitled].  Both Both Series, 2012.
Homage to Villon.  Beard of Bees, 2014.
 Works and Days of the fénéon collective, Delete Press (e-book), 2014.
Prize List. Delete Press (e-book), 2015.
Homage to the Pseudo Avant-Garde (Dispatches Editions, 2017).
Because of Poetry, I Have a Really Big House (Shearsman Books, 2020).

Edited Collections and Translations
A Nation of Poets: Writings from the Poetry Workshops of Nicaragua (translation, introduction and interview with Father Ernesto Cardenal). West End Press, 1985.
Have You Seen a Red Curtain in my Weary Chamber: Poems, Stories and Essays by Tomás Borge Martínez (translation, with Russell Bartley and Sylvia Yoneda). Curbstone Press, 1989. 
Beneath a Single Moon: Buddhism in Contemporary American Poetry (editor, with Craig Paulenich). Shambhala, 1990.
Third Wave: The New Russian Poetry (editor, with Stephen Ashby). University of Michigan Press, 1992.
Joyous Young Pines (editor, Araki Yasusada chapbook). Juniper Press, 1995.
Doubled Flowering: From the Notebooks of Araki Yasusada (editor). Roof Books, 1997.
Immanent Visitor: Selected Poems of Jaime Saenz (translation, with Forrest Gander). University of California Press, 2002
Also, with My Throat, I Shall Swallow Ten Thousand Swords: Letters of Araki Yasusada (editor). Combo Books, 2005.
 The Night, Jamie Saenz (translation with Forrest Gander). Princeton University Press, 2007.
Hotel Lautreamont: Contemporary Poetry from Uruguay (editor, with Roberto Echavarren). Shearsman Books (UK), 2012.
The Herald of Madrid: César Vallejo’s Lost Interview (annotated translation). Ugly Duckling Presse, 2014.
Resist Much, Obey Little: Poems to the Resistance (coordinated and introduced with Michael Boughn, Dispatches Editions, 2017).
El Misterio Nadal: A Lost and Rescued Book (Spuyten Duyvil, 2018).
Materia Prima: Selected Poems of Amanda Berenguer (co-edited with Kristin Dykstra, Ugly Duckling Presse, 2019).

Prose and Critical Fiction
Poetic Architecture: Eleven Quizzes. BlazeVox Books, 2007.
"DAY." BlazeVOX/The Figures, 2010.
Doggerel for the Masses. BlazeVox Books, 2012.
A Question Mark above the Sun: Documents on the Mystery Surrounding a Famous Poem “by” Frank O’Hara. Starcherone Books, 2012 (previously published by Punch Press, 2011).
I Once Met: A Partial Memoir of the Poetry Field. Longhouse Books (revised and expanded edition), 2015.

Selected Interviews
 
 
 
 
 Rain Taxi Interview, conducted by Michael Boughn

Selected Essays
 
 
 
 
 "Poetic Economies of Scale"  The Claudius App
 
 
 
"Why Communism Looks Out of Their Eyes"

External links 
 Author Bio
"Some Darker Bouquets": Thirty two poets and critics respond to Johnson's comments on "Negative Reviews"

Johnson talk at The Walker Center
Jeffery Beam on Homage to the Last Avant-Garde in Oyster Boy Review
Michael Theune on various works by Johnson
Tony Tost on The Miseries of Poetry in Jacket Magazine
David Hadbawnik on "Kent Johnson's Hybrid Critique" in Montevidayo
Jenny Hendrix on A Question Mark Above the Sun in The New Republic
Jeremy Noel-Tod, review of I Once Met in Chicago Review

References 

1955 births
2022 deaths
American literary critics
American male non-fiction writers
American male poets